Norway sent a delegation to compete at the 1976 Summer Paralympics in Toronto, Canada. Its athletes finished sixteenth in the overall medal count.

Medalists

See also 
 Norway at the Paralympics
 Norway at the 1976 Summer Olympics

References 

Nations at the 1976 Summer Paralympics
1976
Summer Paralympics